Nikolay Noritsyn (born May 28, 1991) is a Canadian chess player and coach. He holds the FIDE title of International Master.

Biography
Noritsyn was born in Kaliningrad, Russia. He moved to Canada in December 2001. He won the Canadian Closed Championship in 2007 and was awarded the International Master title as a result. He finished second behind Luke McShane at the 2010 Canadian Open Chess Championship. In 2011 he won the Quebec Open Chess Championship. He has represented Canada at the 2008, 2010, 2018, and 2012 Chess Olympiads.

References

External links
 
 
 
 

1991 births
Living people
Canadian chess players
Chess International Masters
Chess Olympiad competitors